MJT + 3 is an album by MJT + 3, recorded in 1960 for Vee-Jay Records.

Track listing 
"Branching Out" (Mabern) - 6:57
"Lil' Abner" (Willie Thomas) - 4:10
"Don't Ever Throw My Love Away" (Strozier) - 9:08
"Raggity Man" (Thomas) - 6:29
"To Sheila" (Strozier) - 4:57
"Love for Sale" (Porter) - 4:00

Personnel 
 Frank Strozier - alto sax, flute
 Willie Thomas - trumpet
 Harold Mabern - piano
 Bob Cranshaw - bass
 Walter Perkins - drums

References 

1961 albums
Vee-Jay Records albums